Tartaglione may refer to:
 Antonio Tartaglione (born 1998), Italian footballer
 Christine Tartaglione, a Democratic member of the Pennsylvania State Senate for the 2nd District 
 John Tartaglione (January 14, 1921 – November 12, 2003), an American comic book artist 
 Margaret M. Tartaglione, Philadelphia City Commissioner through January 2012, mother of Christine Tartaglione